Balram Singh Rai (8 February 1921 – January 2022) was a Guyanese politician. He served as Minister of Community Development and Education from 1959 to 1961, then the first Minister of Home Affairs from 1961 to 1962.

Education and early career
Rai was born on 8 February 1921 in Beterverwagting Village on the East Coast of Demerara, the child of Ramlachan and Radha Rai. They are Hindus of the Arya Samaj denomination from which Rai never deviated by all accounts.

He passed his Junior and Senior Cambridge exams at the age of 13, and 16, respectively, and received an LLB degree with honors from the University of London. One early prominent position he held was Vice President of the Civil Service Administration in 1949. While a civil servant, he promoted the then PPP leader, Cheddi Jagan, as a candidate for the 1947 General Election. In 1952, Rai was called to the bar at Middle Temple.

Political affiliations
Rai entered politics when Guyana had three major rival parties—The People's Progressive Party (PPP), The People's National Congress (PNC), and The United Force (UF). He sided with the PPP, but later he made a controversial move to form his own party, the Justice Party. The controversy ranged over jobs, race, power, and corruption. Rai’s party, however, could not penetrate the market share of the established parties—PPP, PNC, and UF. In the 1964 general election, the JP got only 1,334 votes, less than a percent, and not amounting to a seat in parliament.

Parliamentary years
Rai represented Central Demerara in parliament during the 1957-1964 period. During 1959-1961 he was Minister of Community Development and Education, and during 1961-1962 he was Minister of Home Affairs. On November 1970, he went into voluntary exile, living at Ealing, London, UK.

Political achievements
As Minister of Education, he abolished the dual control of school, and brought the denomination schools under government control. This achievement aimed to disallow indoctrination of students into other faiths.
He chose a merit system to fill government positions. This is sometimes called a policy of “Guianization,” which did not discriminate among the nation's six nationalities.
On the human-rights side, he ordered the police to step down from their aggressive policy of shooting people perceived as creating disturbances during the Black Friday Riot incident of 16 February 1962.

Death
Rai died in Oxford, England during the second week of January 2022, at the age of 100.

Further reading
Rambarack, Baytoram. (2005). Against the Grain: Balram Singh Rai and the Politics of Guyana. San Juan: Chakra Publishing House.

References

1921 births
2022 deaths
Alumni of the Inns of Court School of Law
Arya Samajis
Government ministers of Guyana
Guyanese centenarians
Guyanese politicians of Indian descent
Members of the National Assembly (Guyana)
Men centenarians
People from Demerara-Mahaica